Buellia magaliesbergensis is a species of crustose lichen in the family Caliciaceae. Found in South Africa, it was formally described as a new species in 2021 by lichenologists John Alan Elix and Helmut Mayrhofer. Here the saxicolous lichen was found growing on rocks on the ground. The species epithet refers to the type locality, which is the only location where the lichen has been documented. The results of standard chemical spot tests are: thallus K+ (yellow), P+ (yellow-orange), and C−. Buellia magaliesbergensis contains norstictic acid as a major secondary chemical, and connorstictic acid as a minor compound.

See also
List of Buellia species

References

magaliesbergensis
Lichen species
Lichens described in 2021
Lichens of South Africa
Taxa named by John Alan Elix
Taxa named by Helmut Mayrhofer